Prolyfic (born David Lemar Ewing Jr. ; April 2, 1981) is an American Grammy-nominated hip-hop record producer, and songwriter best known for his work with hip hop artist Lupe Fiasco.

Early life
David Lemar Ewing Jr. was born in Chicago, Illinois the son of Anita Logan and David Lemar Ewing Sr. As a teenager, Ewing became interested in hip hop, performing amateur raps at age fourteen under the name Prolyfic. Although a student at Simeon Career Academy on the southside, he frequently participated in freestyle battles at local parties across town, he made way to gain the approval of hip hop underground audiences, alongside fellow members of his Inner Circle/I.C.U squad.

As Ewing's reputation grew, more popular crew's sought out to acquire him as a member. In 1997 he joined the group ILL Nature, and merged a union between the groups he had already led, and the new group he was a part of, to create the "360 Click", a crew that consisted of Inner Circle, I.C.U., & ILL Nature. They then went on to win several local, as well as All City Rap Battles, including Ewing winning 2 himself, and placing runner up in his very first attendance against local legend Profound.

As Ewing started to mature, his focus leaned more in the favor of hip hop production, purchasing his first MPC2000XL by the age of 18. Fellow Chicago producer Boogz heard his material and, taken by Ewing's  unique sense of sample selection, began working with him, as well as introducing him to the circle of chi-town producers Ewing would later become a part of. Including No I.D., Kanye West, Brian "Allday" Miller, & few others. Prolyfic recalls: "I started working on my craft and getting better and better and there was this cat named Boogz, who I hooked up with at the time. We used to always hang out at the Point over on 55th and Lake Shore – that was Hip Hop land..... Boogz looked at me as a smaller version of himself.... He saw that I had a good ear for samples, but he knew I needed help on certain things. He showed me how to chop the samples up.... The way Dion "(No I.D.)" and Kanye do it. He showed me that style of chopping. He introduced me to people like Icedrake, Kanye West, No I.D. and Dug Infinite. So Boogz is really the person who is responsible for bringing me into the circle."

Career
In 2000, Prolyfic inked his first deal with local production company "Infared Music Group", alongside fellow producer Boogz, and other hip hop acts such as Yung Berg, & L.e.p. His first production placement was on Dame Dash Presents: Paid In Full/Dream Team Soundtrack with Oschino & Sparks on the song entitled "On and Poppin". After a brief stint at Infared, Prolyfic then became an in-house producer for Lupe Fiasco's 1st & 15th production company, but left shortly after the release of Fiasco's Grammy Award Winning debut album, Lupe Fiasco's Food & Liquor.

Citing "No I.D." as his mentor, teacher, & friend, Prolyfic learns by watching and studying under the legendary Chicago producer's wing. He is currently executive producing the release of Detroit-Chicago based recording artist Drey Skonie's debut EP entitled "One Night Stand" slated to be released March 2014.

Discography

Grammy Awards

|-
|rowspan="3" | 2007
| Lupe Fiasco's Food & Liquor
| Best Rap Album
|  
|}

BET Hip-Hop Awards

|-
| 2006
| Lupe Fiasco's Food & Liquor
| Hip-Hop CD of the Year
| 
|}

Executive produced/A&R

References

External links
 Prolyfic's Soundcloud
 Prolyfic's Myspace

Living people
1981 births
Record producers from Illinois
Songwriters from Illinois